The Round Barn, Washington Township is a historic building located near Sciola in rural Montgomery County, Iowa, United States. It was built in 1917 as a hog barn. Typical of a barn built for this use in features a multitude of windows on the wall and on the cupola, which provided light and ventilation. The building is a 24-sided structure that measures  in diameter. The barn features red vertical siding, a 12-section cupola, and a two-pitch sectional roof. It has been listed on the National Register of Historic Places since 1986.

References

 

Infrastructure completed in 1917
Buildings and structures in Montgomery County, Iowa
National Register of Historic Places in Montgomery County, Iowa
Barns on the National Register of Historic Places in Iowa
Round barns in Iowa